My Son Peter (Danish: Min søn Peter) is a 1953 Danish film directed by Jon Iversen and starring Gunnar Lauring, Berthe Qvistgaard and Frits Helmuth.

Cast
 Gunnar Lauring as Michael  
 Berthe Qvistgaard as Lydia  
 Frits Helmuth as Peter 
 Helga Frier as Husholdersken Josse  
 Lily Broberg as Herdis Winkel  
 Helge Kjærulff-Schmidt as Vekseler Philip Nickelmann  
 Agnes Rehni as Fru Nickelmann 
 Arthur Jensen as Chauffør Alfred Olsen  
 Johannes Meyer as Carl Frederik  
 Ulla Lock as Annelise  
 Keld Markuslund as Telegrafbudet 
 Henry Nielsen 
 Ib Schønberg as Mand på dræsine

References

Bibliography 
 Jill Nelmes & Jule Selbo. Women Screenwriters: An International Guide. Palgrave Macmillan, 2015.

External links 
 

1953 films
1950s Danish-language films
Films directed by Jon Iversen
Danish black-and-white films